The Shire of Hinchinbrook is a local government area in North Queensland, Queensland, Australia.

The council consists of a mayor plus six councillors, each of whom represents the entire Shire. Prior to 2008, the council consisted of a mayor plus eight councillors.

History

The Hinchinbrook Division was created on 11 November 1879 as one of 74 divisions around Queensland under the Divisional Boards Act 1879 with a population of 326. It originally covered a much larger area, extending well into the Tablelands Region.

On 3 September 1881, the Tinaroo Division was created on 3 September 1881 under the Divisional Boards Act 1879 out of parts of the Cairns, Hinchinbrook and Woothakata Divisions.

On 28 October 1881, part of Hinchinbrook Division was separated to create the Johnstone Division.

On 18 January 1884 part of Hinchinbrook Division was separated to create the Cardwell Division.

With the passage of the Local Authorities Act 1902, Hinchinbrook Division became Shire of Hinchinbrook on 31 March 1903.

Hinchinbrook was one of the few shires outside of remote areas in Queensland not to be affected by amalgamations in 2007–2008. It was considered for amalgamation into the Cassowary Coast Region with Cardwell and Johnstone, but the Local Government Commissioners accepted arguments by the council that there was no significant community of interest between the three, that amalgamation would not improve financial sustainability and that the resulting council would have a large north-south distance which would impact upon economies of scale.

Shire hall

The first shire hall was constructed in 1883, but was destroyed by fire in May 1916. A new double-storey building was built at a different site in 1919. The present shire hall opened in 1963.

Libraries 

Hinchinbrook Shire Council operates public libraries at Ingham and Halifax.

Towns and localities
The Shire of Hinchinbrook includes the following settlements:

 Abergowrie
 Bambaroo
 Bemerside
 Blackrock
 Braemeadows
 Cordelia
 Forrest Beach
 Gairloch
 Garrawalt
 Halifax
 Hawkins Creek
 Helens Hill
 Hinchinbrook

 Ingham
 Lannercost Extension
 Long Pocket
 Lucinda
 Macknade
 Mount Fox
 Stone River
 Taylors Beach
 Toobanna
 Trebonne
 Victoria Plantation
 Yuruga

Population

Chairmen and mayors
Chairmen of the Hinchinbrook Divisional Board
 1880–1882: Frank Neame
 1883–1886: Alfred Sandlings Cowley
 1887: Henry Stone
 1888: A. J. Traill (resigned)
 1888–1892: W. T. White
 1893: Arthur Gedge
 1894: W. T. White (again)
 1895–1899: Henry Stone (again)
 1900: P. J. Cochrane
 1901–1902: Arthur Gedge (again)
 Chairmen of the Hinchinbrook Shire Council
 1903: Frank Fraser
 1904–1905: R.G. Johnson (resigned)
 1905–1909: Francis Andrew O'Connor Cassady
 1910–1913: Martin Flynn (resigned)
 1913–1915: Francis Andrew O'Connor Cassady (again)
 1916–1920: J. W. Cartwright
 1921–1936: Francis Andrew O'Connor Cassady (again, died 23 March 1936)
 1936: F. J. Heard (temporary)
 1936–1942: James Lawrence Kelly
 1943–1945: F. N. Alston
 1946–1954: James Lawrence Kelly (again)
 1955–1977: W. O. Garbutt (died)
 May 1977 – 1981 : S. Cavallaro
 1982–1984: A. J. Andrews
 1985–1987: J. J. Williams
 1988–1993 : R. S. Brown
Mayors of Hinchinbrook Shire
 1994–1999 : Giuseppantonio (Pino) Giandomenico
 2000–2003 : Keith Thomas Phillips
 2004–2011: Giuseppantonio (Pino) Giandomenico
 2012–2016 : Mansell (Rodger) Bow
 2016–present: Ramon Jayo

References

External links

Hinchinbrook Shire Council

 
Local government areas of Queensland
1879 establishments in Australia
North Queensland